Ouhans is a commune in the Doubs department in the Bourgogne-Franche-Comté region in eastern France. The source of the river Loue is in the commune.

Population

See also
 Communes of the Doubs department

References

Communes of Doubs